Raymond Pannier (born 12 February 1961 in Saint-Quentin-en-Yvelines) is a French former athlete who specialised in the 3000 metres steeplechase. He represented his country at the 1988 Summer Olympics as well as the 1987 World Championships, reaching the final on both occasions.

International competitions

Personal bests
1500 metres – 3:40.5 (Fontainebleau 1982)
3000 metres – 7:45.82 (La Coruña 1988)
5000 metres – 13:35.71 (Koblenz 1988)
2000 metres steeplechase – 5:31.01 (Seoul 1988)
3000 metres steeplechase – 8:13.88 (Nice 1987)

References

All-Athletics profile

1961 births
Living people
Sportspeople from Yvelines
French male steeplechase runners
Athletes (track and field) at the 1988 Summer Olympics
Olympic athletes of France
World Athletics Championships athletes for France